Porfirio Ricardo José Luis Daniel Oduber Quirós (August 25, 1921 – October 13, 1991) was a Costa Rican politician, lawyer, philosopher, poet, and essayist. He served as the President of Costa Rica from 1974 to 1978. He is credited with the creation of the Sistema Nacional de Radio y Televisión and the Universidad Estatal a Distancia.

Oduber worked as a lawyer early in his career. In 1945, Oduber went to Canada to study philosophy at McGill University, graduating with a Master of Arts degree. In 1948, he returned to Costa Rica and participated in the revolution led by José Figueres Ferrer. When their faction won, he was named Secretary General of the Second Republic of Costa Rica.

Some time later he traveled to Paris, where he continued his philosophical studies at the Sorbonne. In 1948, while studying in France, he married Marjorie Elliott Sypher, the daughter of Canadian diplomats. The couple had two children, Luis Adrian and Ana María.

After returning to Costa Rica, he worked in national politics, working with the Figueres presidency campaign and becoming an Ambassador in Mexico and later in Europe. He also served as foreign minister from 1962 to 1964. He was President of the Legislative Assembly of Costa Rica from 1970 to 1973.

He was elected president in 1974. His government was very socially focused, dealing 
heavily with working class issues. He worked on raising the quality of life of 
rural areas and bettered pricing for agricultural products. A lot of attention was 
given to reforestation and the preservation of natural resources. On the international 
front, his government was popular amongst the Central American nations. During his term
in office, Oduber granted legal status to the communist party (1975) and restored consular relations with Cuba (1977). 
He sided and worked with Presidents Jimmy Carter and Omar Torrijos to defend 
Panama's sovereignty.

The airport located near Liberia, Daniel Oduber International Airport, was named in his honor.  There is a full statue of him in San Jose, the capital of Costa Rica.

Daniel Oduber died on 13 October 1991 in Escazú.

References

1921 births
1991 deaths
Presidents of Costa Rica
Presidents of the Legislative Assembly of Costa Rica
Ambassadors of Costa Rica to Mexico
National Liberation Party (Costa Rica) politicians
McGill University alumni
University of Paris alumni
People from San José, Costa Rica
People from Escazú (canton)
Grand Crosses Special Class of the Order of Merit of the Federal Republic of Germany
Costa Rican expatriates in France
Costa Rican expatriates in Canada